The NIA Technique is a mind/body physical conditioning program that initially stood for Non-Impact Aerobics, a health and fitness alternative that emerged in the '80's, and evolved to include neurological integrative practices and teachings.  The Nia Technique was founded in 1983 by Debbie Rosas and Carlos AyaRosas in the San Francisco area. Nia combines martial arts, modern dance arts and yoga in a workout set to music.

History 
From 1972 to 1983 Debbie Rosas operated an exercise business in the San Francisco Bay Area known as the Bod Squad.  In 1983 a series of sports related injuries prompted her to research and develop an alternative method of aerobic exercise and strength training aiming for safe, non-impact, bodymind based movement.

This led to the establishment of the Nia Technique. Nia Technique headquarters moved to Portland, Oregon in 1991 and is currently overseen by Debbie Rosas, CEO.

Further reading
The Nia Technique, (Three Rivers Press) 2005

References

External links
 Nia Company website

Aerobic exercise
Mind–body interventions
Modern dance